Simon Denny (born 1982, in Auckland) is a contemporary artist based in Berlin. He represented New Zealand at the 2015 Venice Biennale. Since 2018 he is a professor for time based media at the HFBK Hamburg.

Education

Denny studied at the University of Auckland’s Elam School of Fine Arts from 2001 to 2005 and Meisterschule, Städelschule, Frankfurt am Main from 2007 to 2009.

Career

Denny makes sculptures and installations that take his research into the practices and aesthetics of technology companies and products as their starting point. His subject matter has included the redesign of the New Zealand passport, German technology conferences, and internet entrepreneur Kim Dotcom.

Denny has produced three exhibitions under the title The Personal Effects of Kim Dotcom, in which the artist presented replicas and stand-ins for the items seized from Kim Dotcom's home in a raid carried out by New Zealand Police. The exhibition was first presented at Museum moderner Kunst Stiftung Ludwig Wien (mumok) in Vienna in 2013, then recreated at Firstsite in Colchester and the Adam Art Gallery in Wellington in 2014.

In 2015 Denny had his first major American solo museum show, The Innovator's Dilemma at MoMA PS1. In November 2015 his solo exhibition Products for Organising opened at the Serpentine Gallery in London. Denny is represented by Galerie Buchholz. Denny entered into cryptoart in 2021.

Denny was also a founding member of the Auckland artist-run gallery Gambia Castle.

Venice Biennale 2015

In 2013 Denny was announced as New Zealand's representative at the 56th Venice Biennale. His Secret Power installations were staged at the Biblioteca Nazionale Marciana and the arrivals lounge of the Marco Polo Airport. Based on Denny's research into the National Security Agency's use of imagery, the exhibition in the artist's words examines '“the way the contemporary world is depicted in imagery used by the NSA; and it imagines a possible artistic context for the way that imagery was produced.”

In September 2015 New Zealand's national museum, Te Papa, announced it had acquired four works from the Secret Power installation for its permanent collection.

Awards and recognition

2012 finalist in the Walters Prize, New Zealand
2012 Baloise Art Prize at Art Basel for Channel Document project 
2013 selected for the curated exhibition at the 2013 Venice Biennale
2015 represented New Zealand at the 2015 Venice Biennale
2015 recognised as a 'New Generation' artist by the Arts Foundation of New Zealand

Exhibitions
2019 Mine Museum of Old and New Art Tasmania, Australia
2021 Mine Petzel Gallery New York
2021 Pioneers Petzel Gallery at Art Basel OVR
2020 Altman Siegel at Art Basel OVR: Miami Beach
2020 Curated Selection: New Painting, Sculpture, and Works on Paper Petzel Gallery, New York

References

1982 births
Artists from Auckland
University of Auckland alumni
Living people
New Zealand contemporary artists
Städelschule alumni